Stella is an unincorporated community in Jackson Township, Vinton County, Ohio, in the United States.

History
A post office was established at Stella in 1880, and remained in operation until 1907.

References

Populated places in Vinton County, Ohio